The 1925 Northern Illinois State Teachers football team represented Northern Illinois State Teachers College as an independent during the 1925 college football season. They were led by third-year head coach William Muir and played their home games at Glidden Field, located on the east end of campus. The Teachers finished the season with a 6–1 record. Junior Hahn was the team's captain.

While Northern Illinois State had been a member of the Illinois Intercollegiate Athletic Conference prior to the 1925 season, it withdrew from the conference prior to its first game against another member, the October 10 game against North-Western College. Despite its withdrawal, North-Western attempted to protest the result of the game to conference officials, claiming that Northern Illinois State had used ineligible players.

Schedule

References

Northern Illinois State
Northern Illinois Huskies football seasons
Northern Illinois State Teachers football